The 1979 Race of Champions was a Formula One non-championship motor race held at Brands Hatch, United Kingdom on 15 April 1979. The field was made up of seven Formula One cars that competed in the World championship while the rest of the field usually competed in the Aurora series.

Race summary
Brabham had brought two brand new BT48s onto the circuit. Another new car introduced was the Lotus 80, but Mario Andretti only used it in qualifying. Ferrari's Gilles Villeneuve drove a slightly modified 1978 Ferrari 312 T3 instead of the new 312 T4.

At the start Niki Lauda got away well from the front row and quickly pulled a lead of a few seconds, while the pole sitter Mario Andretti was dropped down to third. Gilles Villeneuve was second, followed closely by Andretti and Nelson Piquet. By lap eight the chasing three drivers had caught Lauda and they were going nose to tail. But that didn't last for long, as Lauda had to pit at the end of the eight lap, but he was able to rejoin rather quickly. Villeneuve took over the lead, only to lose it a few laps later as he ran wide at the exit of Hawthorn corner. Andretti moved into the lead in his Lotus 79. On lap 11 Piquet was also forced to pit in, so the leading battle was between Andretti and Villeneuve, while Jochen Mass in the Arrows had taken advantage of the pitstops and moved up to third place.

The positions in the front of the field remained the same for the next 12 laps. Andretti's lead was up to four seconds after Villeneuve's mistake, but the Canadian closed the gap slowly but surely. By lap 26 Villeneuve was all over the back of Andretti and a few laps later took the inside line into Paddock Hill bend and retook the lead. Andretti had no answer to Villeneuve's pace and the gap increased rapidly. Piquet had moved ahead of Mass into third and his team mate Lauda, who had pitted twice, was fifth. A few laps from the end Piquet overtook the slowing Andretti as well. But in the end it was Villeneuve who crossed the line first, lapping everyone up to the fourth place man.

Classification

Qualifying

Race

Notes 
 Pole position: Mario Andretti – 1:17.52
 Fastest lap: Nelson Piquet – 1:17.46

References 

Race of Champions (Brands Hatch)
Race of Champions
Race of Champions
Race of Champions